Terraced Gardens of Rivington (Leverhulmes Former Gardens) is a landscaped woodland on the hillside of Rivington Pike, in Rivington Parish in the Chorley Borough of Lancashire, England, originally designed as a Garden by T.H Mawson and built as curtilage to a home of the soap magnate Viscount Leverhulme, as such the area is not part of Lever Park. Today the former gardens are Grade II listed and contain 11 Grade II structures. The design had three elements, the upper part being in the romanesque architectural style, the lower section known as the Ravine a woodland incorporated into the design with a manmade stream passing through, and a former Japanese-style garden has the remains of a manmade pond, made from Pulmonite.  The gardens are today leased to Rivington Heritage Trust by United Utilities and are undergoing restoration and preservation.

The Bungalow 

The original gardens were created to serve a former Bungalow demolished in 1948 belonging to Leverhulme, a founder of Lever Brothers, today known as Unilever. The site has surviving stone structures that formed part of the Italian-style gardens designed by Thomas Mawson between 1905 and 1922,  inspired by Villa d’ Este near Rome, its design features in his book 'The Art and Craft of Garden Making, published 1912. There were four lodge houses acting as gatehouses of the grounds. Three were small prefabricated cottage-style properties, the fourth was Stone House Lodge, which had a design with an archway incorporated and build over the entrance.

Roynton Cottage was built on the hillside and was a large prefabricated wooden structure, purchased from the Portable Building Company, Manchester, earth was first broken for it in 1900, this wooden structure was destroyed 1913 in an arson attack by suffragette, Edith Rigby The home and grounds were referred to in the Liverpool Corporation Act 1902 as 'The Bungalow', owned by William Hesketh Lever, was protected from being taken by the water company without an agreement, the act also protected Leverhulmes shooting rights. This first building became two stories in 1912 just prior to the fire that destroyed it.  Its replacement, designed by his old friend Jonathan Simpson, was built of stone in 1914 at first as a single-story structure with Pergolas, a courtyard, and an aviary. The courtyard was developed into a ballroom and a second floor was added over the servant's quarters as a housekeepers' room in 1923. The building sat on an elevation higher than what became known as the Orchestral lawn, featuring its sundial and a lower elevation than the Pigeon Tower. The current Sun Dial is a reproduction of the missing original donated by the local quarry operator, in 2019.

The main building was accessed by a driveway from Belmont Road. Below the level of the Bungalow is a large stone retaining wall, a section with steps that has arrowslits. Below this level is the Italian-style lake, a small former boating lake that is a feature of this section of the former garden. During the Leverhulme era, the Bungalow and Rivington Hall were home to a highly valuable collection of antiques, from paintings, furniture, statues, pottery, and tapestries. Leverhulmes collection and all household and garden items, even the pigeons, were sold by auction through Knight Frank & Rutley after his death in 1925.

The artist Alfred East stayed at Roynton Cottage in the summer of 1909. Lever commissioned a series of paintings of the surrounding landscape, the reservoirs, the country park, the village, and the pike. Lever gave 15 of them to Bolton Art Gallery and others to Bolton School, the Walker Art Gallery in Liverpool and the Lady Lever Art Gallery at Port Sunlight. East gave two watercolors, A glimpse of Rivington Water and In Rivington Park to Kettering Museum and Art Gallery. The gallery acquired an oil painting [From] Rivington Pike that East exhibited at the Royal Academy in 1913 in the 1960s.

The area is now woodland with remains including foundations of the bungalow, a number of stone summer houses, footpaths, steps, bridges, three ponds, streams, and the restored Pigeon Tower. A Japanese style garden was added in 1923, its features have since been lost, but the pond remains.

Pigeon Tower (Dovecote)
The well-known landmark, reroofed in 2005 and again restored in 2018, is known by various names including Lookout Tower, Dovecote Tower and the Pigeon Tower. It was built between 1905 and 1909 and was a feature created by Mawson as part of an overall design, erected as a birthday present for Leverhulme's wife. Above the ornate fireplace on the upper floor is an inscription of their initials, spelling WHEEL, William Hesketh Elizabeth Ellen Lever and Leverhulme's motto, ‘MUTARE VEL TIMERE SPERNO’ ‘I spurn the fear to change’. The building features a spiral stone staircase and four floors.

Ravine 

Further down the hillside, a section was built in 1921 as a man-made ravine, which along with the Japanese Garden built 1922 made use of artificial rock known as Pulhamite.

Magee Era 
After Lever's death, The Bungalow and grounds were purchased by the Bolton brewer, John Magee during which time he opened the gardens on open days for charity fundraising. Magee was a resident there from 1925 until his death in 1939, during which time he converted part of the great lawn into a tennis court for his daughters. After his death his executor offered the property to Bolton Council who turned it down, fearing the effect of increased local rates needed to cover maintenance costs. Liverpool Corporation then purchased the property in late 1939 in turbulent times just prior to the Second World War. During the war, the building and grounds were requisitioned by the military, and a significant decoy site was nearby.  The bungalow was damaged while in military use and had significant neglect during the war.

In 1945 there was hope use could be found of the Bungalow with use by charities, however, the corporation objected and insisted it must be used as a private dwelling, this prevented charities, and voluntary groups from coming forward, with no buyers and with a great level of neglect and repairs needed demolition was announced 1947 and went ahead by 1948. The Liverpool Corporation Act required that the land owners consent always be obtained for commercial use, since the water company took ownership they have operated without restriction. Protective covenants in the sale from Leverhulme are not enforced.

Great Lawn

A substantial change during the Magee era was the conversion of a large area known as 'The Great Lawn' to private tennis courts, this same site has been granted planning consent by Chorley Council for the Heritage Trust to use as a commercial open air venue for music festivals and in 2021 received planning consent for weddings and wedding receptions, with marquee, catering trailers and temporary toilets - exclusively for the guests and staff. Part of the site is designated as a Site of Special Scientific Interest Ecological Mitigation Measures were discharged in 2018. In 2022 the public toilets serving the Terraced Gardens and wider area were ripped out and converted to a Cafe / Takeaway without replacements.

Preservation 

Liverpool City Council, the former owner, neglected the gardens and planned to demolish the structures and clear the site in 1967, after a public outcry, the Chorley local authority moved to protect the garden's structures by ensuring listed status thus saving the Terraced Gardens from bulldozers.

By 1974 the park and gardens had passed to the North West Water Authority from Liverpool Corporation, and to United Utilities on privatisation. In the mid-1970s the landowner planned to demolish the remaining garden structures, this was prevented by intervention with listed building status by Chorley Council. From 1976 a local voluntary group, the Bolton Conservation Volunteers stepped in and cleared overgrowth and worked to maintain what had by then become an important public asset. The site was used for unofficial Music festivals in 1976 and 1977.

Blue Planet Scheme

Rivington Heritage Trust, a body set up in 1997 by United Utilities in order to obtain £15 million in funding for 'Blue Planet Park' had its plans rejected for funding by the Millennium Commission which would have seen them take over all of Lever Park and Rivington Pike, plans were opposed by six regional MPs and were met with huge local opposition. There was public fear access could be restricted and fee's for entry charged.

Blue Planet associated planning applications were Restoration of semi-derelict landscaped gardens including rebuilding of Stone House Lodge, Tea Houses, Visitors' Pavilion & Bothy, Ref. No: 96/00848/FUL, Application for Listed Building Consent for restoration of various structures, Ref. No: 96/00849/LBC, Infrastructure including car parks, access roadways, paths and avenues, park & ride system, interpretation & screening, Ref. No: 96/00851/FUL all applications were withdrawn. The water company withdrew its bill in parliament in 1997, known as the Lever Park Act. Plans were put on hold by 1998.

All Rhododendron were removed from the gardens in 2006 after Ramorum Disease was found at the site. The site is now a managed woodland.

Rivington Heritage Trust 

Although Rivington Heritage Trust abandoned much of the original Blue Planet Scheme and formed a plan to proceed gradually whilst lobbying and obtaining public support, by 2013 they had succeeded in obtaining £60,000 in grant funding from the Heritage Lottery Fund the Big Lottery Fund and presented new plans for the Rivington Terraced Gardens. By 2016 the trust and Groundwork Cheshire Lancashire and Merseyside were successful in obtaining a grant of £3.4 million from the Heritage Lottery Fund to conserve and repair the Rivington Terraced Gardens and remaining Grade II listed structures. A lease of 50 years was also agreed in 2016 by United Utilities to the Rivington Heritage Trust. In the main the Clearance work has been undertaken by unpaid volunteers. The trust comprises a number of local councillors and employees of United Utilities.

The former gardens are now used to hold a variety of events, mainly at the Great Lawn, former Tennis Lawns, and Italian Lake and Orchestral lawn. Events include a two-day music festival and a light show, whilst also producing and selling Gin.  The site is also available for private hire for weddings. The Lancashire Environmental Fund awarded a grant of £23,000  in 2022 to improve accessibility from Lower House car park via Roynton Road to improve access at the site.

Public Access

The lower section of the grounds has always been freely accessible for members of the public, both Leverhulme and Magee also held open days of the Bungalow's private garden. After the demolition in 1948 for half a century, the public could roam the whole site at will. Rivington former Japanese and Kitchen Gardens within the Bungalow Grounds are now part of an extensive area of open access land recorded at Lancashire County Council and has a right to roam protected by the statutory powers in the Countryside and Rights of Way Act 2000. There is a public footpath and a bridleway from Lever Park to Rivington Pike and Terraced Gardens. The public footpath number 82 runs through the gardens from the Ravine via the former Japanese and Kitchen Gardens, which is also an area of open access land with a right to roam, passing upward past the Great Lawn and an area of Bilberries part of the West Pennine Moors SSSI, toward the site of the former Bungalow and landmark Pigeon Tower then heading to Rivington Pike via Belmont Road.

There are a network of roads that provide access to Rivington recorded on the National Street Gazetteer. Access to the park is by vehicle through Lever Park is via Rivington Lane, (USRN 7401372) the former roads in Lever park are gated and are now bridleways and a network of public footpaths. Toward Rivington Pike the old coach road is Belmont Road (USRN 7400767) and is an open public road from Horwich, the road becomes rougher and less maintained the further up the hill it climbs in the direction of the Pigeon Tower, where it splits. The descending road there leads to Lower House car park but the surface of the road is washed away and not maintained, and the route leading to Rivington Rd and the moorland is gated. 
Roynton Road (USRN: 7400820) provides access to the hillside and the Terraced Gardens from Lever Park and Sheep House Lane, from the direction of Chorley, Belmont and Horwich, the route has gates.

Although the site has many steps at the upper levels the heritage trust can arrange wheelchair access for all-terrain wheelchairs to attend events via the entrance from Lower House Car Park to the great lawn.

Listed buildings and structures

Key

Gallery

References
Notes

Bibliography

Further reading

External links 

 Rivington Terraced Gardens
 Groundwork Project Rivington
 Terraced Gardens on Facebook

Gardens in Lancashire
Grade II listed buildings in Lancashire
Grade II listed parks and gardens in Lancashire
Tourist attractions in Lancashire
Woodland gardens